Pico de Alberto is a mountain in the eastern part of São Nicolau island in Cape Verde. Its elevation is 598 m. The mountain's summit is located south of the village Juncalinho.

References

Alberto
Ribeira Brava, Cape Verde